Robin James Das (born 27 February 2002) is an English cricketer, who plays for Essex and the Dhaka Dominators.

Career
Das plays as a batsman. He scored 200 not out in an under-16 match in July 2018. He made his Twenty20 debut 20 September 2020, for Essex in the 2020 t20 Blast. In 2022, he was a substitute fielder for England in a match against New Zealand at Lord's. He made his List A debut on 5 August 2022, for Essex in the 2022 Royal London One-Day Cup. In January 2023, he was signed by the Dhaka Dominators to play for them in the 2022–23 Bangladesh Premier League.

Personal life
Das is from East London, and is a British Bangladeshi. His family are from the Sylhet Division of Bangladesh. His brother Jonathan has played cricket for the Essex Second XI and Cambridge University. As of 2023, Das was studying history.

References

External links
 

2002 births
Living people
English cricketers
Essex cricketers
People from Leytonstone
British people of Bangladeshi descent
British Asian cricketers